The U.S. Post Office, also known as the Berkeley Main Post Office, is a local branch of the United States Postal Service. The building, located at 2000 Allston Way Berkeley, California, was built in 1914-15.The building has been described as a "free adaptation of Brunelleschi's Foundling Hospital." Designed in the Second Renaissance Revival style, the front of the building features terra cotta arches supported by plain tuscan columns. 

The Post Office is within the Civic Center Historic District, a five block area listed on the National Register of Historic Places. The district is a locally significant ensemble of harmoniously planned civic buildings that retains a high degree of integrity since achieving significance in 1950. The post office, along with the "Old" City Hall (1909) in the Beaux-Arts style, is among the earliest and the most decorative of the thirteen buildings in the district.

The architect is unknown but Oscar Wenderoth is listed on the cornerstone as he was director of the Office of the Supervising Architect that designed this and many other federal government buildings. The floor space doubled with the completion of the annex in 1932. A few years later, the Treasury Relief Art Project commissioned a sculpture and a mural for the lobby. Both are well-preserved examples of the styles, subjects and dominant themes of New Deal Art. The post office was designated Berkeley Landmark No. 38 on June 16, 1980 by the Landmarks Preservation Commission and added to the National Register of Historic Places on January 29, 1981.

Current status
Financial problems fueled by onerous Congressional legislation which introduced an unsustainable debt load without acknowledging revenue dynamics prompted a national sale of underused and often aging real estate owned by the USPS. Dozens of properties had been sold despite protests from local communities. The postal service issued a statement that "sales of historic postal properties have been very modest: 7 in 2012 and 6 in 2013." They identified 1,900 properties that are listed or could be considered for listing on the National Register of Historic Places out of 9,000 properties owned by USPS. In 2014, the USPS Office of Inspector General sought an independent review certain appraisals to ensure that they "were representative of the fair market value."

In 2013, the post office was listed for sale with a possible leaseback of the lobby to continue providing postal service. Opponents staged a 33-day encampment on its steps while the City Council unanimously voted to oppose the sale and unsuccessfully sought a one-year delay.

In November, 2014, Postal Officials announced a tentative sales agreement to a local developer. First They Came for the Homeless immediately established a 2nd occupation on the exterior grounds, the City of Berkeley filed a lawsuit against the sale, the seller withdrew, and in April 2015 Federal District Judge Alsup dismissed the case on the basis of the Postal Service's declaration that no sale was pending.  The 2nd occupation lasted until April, 12th, 2016 at which time Postal Police cleared the protest.

See also 
List of United States post offices

Notes

References

External links 

Buildings and structures in Berkeley, California
Government buildings completed in 1914
National Register of Historic Places in Berkeley, California
Berkeley
Renaissance Revival architecture in California
Treasury Relief Art Project
1914 establishments in California